St. Mary's Jacobite Syrian Cathedral, located in Kollam District of Kerala also known as Gothara Idavaka preserved generation of Pakalomattam family who baptized by Saint Thomas, is a Jacobite Syrian Christian Church. As per tradition, Most church members belong to the Pakalomattom family known as Vilayil Tharakan Gothram, the part of the family branch communion.

A part of what is claimed to be the Holy Girdle of the Virgin Mary, which according to a medieval legend was dropped by her from the sky to Saint Thomas the Apostle at or around the time of her assumption to heaven, was given to the cathedral in 1972.

Altars 
The Major altar dedicated to Saint Mary Mother of God others for Saint Peter the Apostle, Saint Thomas the Apostle, Saint George and Saint Geevarghese Mar Gregorios of Parumala

Gallery

See also
Pakalomattom family

References 

Churches in Kollam district
Syriac Orthodox churches in India
Soonoro churches in Kerala
Syriac Orthodox cathedrals
Oriental Orthodox cathedrals in India